Jukjeon Station is a station on the Bundang Line, located in Jukjeon-dong of Suji-gu, Yongin. It opened on Christmas Eve in 2007 and plays a crucial role in relieving the traffic congestion of the northwestern part of Yongin. It is also the closest station to the Yongin campus of Dankook University, with shuttle buses expected to run between the university and the station.

This station is unique in that it is built into the Jukjeon Shinsegae Department Store.

Its station subname is Dankook Univ., where said university is located nearby.

References

Seoul Metropolitan Subway stations
Railway stations opened in 2007
Metro stations in Yongin